Popularly known as Daman or Palung or Tistung - Palung, Thaha Municipality (थाहा नगरपालिका) is a municipality in Makwanpur District of Bagmati Province in mid Nepal. In Nepali Thaha, (थाहा) means to know. It was one of the biggest communist political movement led by hon. Rupchandra Bista (Ru Da Ne). He started the Thaha Movement which is dedicated to his contributions to this region.

It is one of the most known tourist destinations and best places to live in Bagmati Province with its mild climate. It's never too hot in summer nor too cold in winter. Winter can be a bit cold, causing the water to freeze and some snowfall too, usually in the upper hills of the valley. There is no snowfall in the valley since 2063 B.S.

History 
The municipality was established on 18 May 2014 by merging the existing Palung, Daman and Bajrabarahi village development committees.

On new Constitution of Nepal,  there is provision of one state, 7 provinces and 744 local bodies. Thaha municipality is one local body out of 10 in Makwanpur district, formed by merging existing Thaha municipality, Bajrabarahi VDC, Chitlang VDC and Aagra VDC. This municipality is divided in to 12 wards to facilitate in administrative and development activities.

Main occupation of people living here is agriculture. They are one of the major exporters of potato and other vegetables (cauliflower, cabbage, brinjal, radish and different varieties of green chillies including capsicum) to big cities like Kathmandu, Hetauda, Narayangadh, Pokhara, Birgunj and even to India. Vegetable cultivation started only after 2050 B.S. Before that people used to cultivate rice, wheat, millet, barley, etc. But now vegetable cultivation have changed the lifestyle of whole valley. It's very hard to see rice, wheat cultivation anymore. Everyone is just busy making money by selling vegetables.

Shikharkot, Thana Bazzar, Bagekhola, Okhar Bazzar, Phant Bazzar and Khalte Bazzar are the major gathering and market place in Thaha Nagar Palika.

Demographics
At the time of the 2011 Nepal census, Thaha Municipality had a population of 42,122. Of these, 45.2% spoke Tamang, 34.1% Nepali, 18.2% Newar, 1.3% Lepcha, 0.4% Bhojpuri, 0.2% Magar, 0.1% Gurung, 0.1% Maithili, 0.1% Tharu and 0.1% other languages as their first language.

In terms of ethnicity/caste, 47.2% were Tamang, 20.1% Newar, 19.3% Chhetri, 4.3% Hill Brahmin, 2.0% Magar, 1.6% Kami, 1.2% Gurung, 1.2% Thakuri, 0.9% Damai/Dholi, 0.4% Gharti/Bhujel, 0.3% Sarki, 0.2% Ghale, 0.2% Kalwar, 0.2% Sunuwar, 0.1% other Dalit, 0.1% Musalman, 0.1% Sanyasi/Dasnami, 0.1% Tharu and 0.2% others.

In terms of religion, 55.0% were Hindu, 42.0% Buddhist, 2.7% Christian, 0.1% Muslim and 0.1% others.

References

Populated places in Makwanpur District
Municipalities in Bagmati Province
Nepal municipalities established in 2014